Calathea orbifolia is a species of prayer plant. Native to Bolivia, it is commonly kept as a houseplant in temperate zones for its ornamental leaves. It requires partial shade, humidity, and good drainage to thrive.

References 

orbifolia
Flora of Bolivia